Karsten Hanlin (born December 13, 1993) is an American soccer player who plays as a midfielder.

College

Hanlin played college soccer at the University of Denver.

Professional

On March 9, 2017 Hanlin signed with USL side Real Monarchs He scored his first professional goal against Los Dos on May 10, 2017 

Hanlin signed with FC Tucson on January 29, 2019, ahead of their first season in USL League One.

References

External links

1993 births
Living people
People from Centennial, Colorado
American soccer players
Association football midfielders
Denver Pioneers men's soccer players
Real Monarchs players
Colorado Springs Switchbacks FC players
FC Tucson players
Soccer players from Denver
USL Championship players
USL League One players